Ostrov Yunosti (Russian: Остров Юности) is a river island in the center of the city of Irkutsk, Russia. This island is covered with woodland and is a popular place for walking. Other attractions include cafes and discos.

A bridge joins the island to the river bank, close to the river fountain and the monument of Alexander III.

See also
 List of islands of Russia

River islands of Russia
Landforms of Irkutsk Oblast
River islands of Asia